David L. "Dave" Newmark (born September 11, 1946) is an American former professional basketball player.

Biography
Born in Brooklyn, New York, Newmark is Jewish, and graduated from Lincoln High School in New York City. He was a high school All-American.

He played in the 1966 Pan American Maccabiah Games in Brazil. He played with, among others, Barry Liebowitz, Mark Turenshine and Rick Weitzman.

He played college basketball at Columbia University. As a sophomore in 1966 he had a rebounding average of 13.3 per game (best in the conference), scored 22.4 points per game (second in the conference), and was named an All-American. He was named All-Ivy League in 1966 and 1968.

A 7'0" center, he played in the National Basketball Association on the Chicago Bulls the 1968-69 season and on the Atlanta Hawks in 1969-70. He then spent the 1970–71 season in the American Basketball Association as a member of the Carolina Cougars. In his NBA/ABA career, he scored 1,003 total points and grabbed 678 total rebounds.

Newmark later played in Israel for Hapoel Tel Aviv during the 1973–74 and 1977–78 seasons.

He has two children, Rebecca Newmark Goldman and Brian Newmark.

References

External links

1946 births
Living people
Abraham Lincoln High School (Brooklyn) alumni
American men's basketball players
Atlanta Hawks players
Basketball players from New York City
Carolina Cougars players
Centers (basketball)
Chicago Bulls draft picks
Chicago Bulls players
Columbia Lions men's basketball players
Columbia University alumni
Hapoel Tel Aviv B.C. players
Israeli Basketball Premier League players
Israeli Jews
Israeli men's basketball players
Jewish men's basketball players
Parade High School All-Americans (boys' basketball)
People from Brighton Beach
Sportspeople from Brooklyn